The 2004–05 Elitserien season was the 30th season of Elitserien. It started on September 20, 2004, with the regular season ending March 1, 2005. The playoffs of the 81st Swedish Championship ended on April 11, with Frölunda HC taking the championship.

Regular season

Final standings
GP = Games Played, W = Wins, L = Losses, T = Ties, OTW = Overtime Wins, OTL = Overtime Losses, GF = Goals For, GA = Goals Against, Pts = Points
x - clinched playoff spot, y - clinched regular season league title, e - eliminated from playoff contention, r - play in relegation series

Scoring leaders 
 
GP = Games played; G = Goals; A = Assists; Pts = Points; +/– = Plus/minus; PIM = Penalty minutes

Leading goaltenders 

GP = Games played; TOI = Time on ice (minutes); GA = Goals against; SO = Shutouts; Sv% = Save percentage; GAA = Goals against average

Playoffs
After the regular season, the standard of 8 teams qualified for the playoffs.

Playoff bracket
In the first round, the highest remaining seed chose which of the four lowest remaining seeds to be matched against. In each round the higher-seeded team was awarded home ice advantage. Each best-of-seven series followed a 1–1–1–2–1–1 format: the higher-seeded team played at home for games 2 and 4 (plus 5 and 7 if necessary), and the lower-seeded team was at home for game 1, 3 and 6 (if necessary).

Playoff scoring leaders 
 
GP = Games played; G = Goals; A = Assists; Pts = Points; +/– = Plus/minus; PIM = Penalty minutes

Playoff leading goaltenders 

GP = Games played; TOI = Time on ice (minutes); GA = Goals against; SO = Shutouts; Sv% = Save percentage; GAA = Goals against average

Elitserien awards

NHL lockout players
Due to the 2004–05 NHL lockout that ultimately cancelled the entirety of the 2004–05 NHL season, the following then-NHL players represented these Elitserien teams during the season:

Brynäs IF
Tyler Arnason
Marc-André Bergeron
Josef Boumedienne
Ronald Petrovický
Chris Phillips
Kimmo Timonen

Djurgårdens IF
Dan Boyle
Mariusz Czerkawski
Nils Ekman
Marcus Nilson
José Théodore
Daniel Tjärnqvist
Marty Turco

Frölunda HC
Daniel Alfredsson
Per-Johan Axelsson
Christian Bäckman
Samuel Påhlsson
Sami Salo

Färjestads BK
Christian Berglund
Zdeno Chára
Mike Comrie
Marián Gáborík
Martin Gerber
Mike Johnson
Sheldon Souray

HV71
Brian Boucher
Jonathan Cheechoo
Anders Eriksson
Manny Malhotra
Bryan McCabe
Mathias Tjärnqvist

Linköpings HC
Kristian Huselius
Mike Knuble
Brendan Morrison
Henrik TallinderLuleå HF
Manny Fernandez
Tomas Holmström
Branko Radivojevič
Steve Staios
Niclas Wallin
Justin Williams
Mattias Öhlund

Malmö Redhawks
Shawn McEachern
Brett McLean
Mark Mowers
Janne Niinimaa
Pasi Nurminen
Richard Park

Modo Hockey
Adrian Aucoin
Peter Forsberg
Dan Hinote
František Kaberle
Bryan Muir
Markus Näslund
Daniel Sedin
Henrik Sedin
Mattias Weinhandl

Mora IK
Daniel Cleary
Shawn Horcoff
Marcel Hossa
Marián Hossa
Andreas Lilja
Ladislav Nagy

Södertälje SK
Kyle Calder
Niclas Hävelid
Olli Jokinen
Mikael Samuelsson
Scott Thornton
Dick Tärnström
Todd White

Timrå IK
Aki-Petteri Berg
Miikka Kiprusoff
Fredrik Modin
Henrik Zetterberg

See also
 2004 in sports
 2005 in sports

External links 
Hockeyligan.se — Official site
Swehockey.se — Official statistics

2004-05
Swe
1